Puttur Shree Mahalingeshwara Temple is a 12th-century temple, located in Puttur, Dakshina Kannada in the Indian state of Karnataka.  Lord Shiva (popularly known as Puttur Mahalingeshwara) is the main deity.

Legend
 
The most common story for the creation of the temple is that in the past, three old and learned Smartha-cult Sthanika Brahmins were travelling through southern India, worshipping a Shiva Linga that they got from the Hindu holy ‘Kshetra of Kashi’. The three were ardent devotees of Shiva. One day they arrived at a place called ‘Gayapada Kshetra’ now known as Uppinangady in Puttur Taluk, Dakshina Kannada.
 
At Uppinangady, one of the three decided to move towards Puttur leaving behind the other two. He reached Puttur one evening, carrying the ‘Shiva Ling’ with him. He got up early the next morning and after a holy bath went to the palace of the Banga King to collect flowers and other essential pooja materials for the worship of Shiva. That day was a Monday, which was considered auspicious for the worship of Lord Shiva. At that time the Banga King did not pay attention to the arrival of this Brahmin, as he was much worried about the labor-pain of his loving sister.
 
However, the minister of the Banga-King, looking at the Divine Brightness in the face of the Brahmin, made an appeal regarding the King's problem. The Brahmin worshipped the linga and blessed the King's sister assuring him that she would safely deliver a baby. Later to the astonishment of all, she gave birth to a baby. The King felt happy over the event and thanked the Brahmin and arranged for the worship of the Lord.
 
Later on that particular day, the Brahmin, knowingly or otherwise, kept the Shiva-Linga on the ground without a stand or seat and worshiped it. After the pooja, he lifted the linga from the ground, in order to keep it again in the container box, but it could not be lifted from the ground. The Brahmin used all his force to lift the linga, but all efforts were in vain. The linga remained in place.
 
The King's army men applied force unsuccessfully. The King's elephant was summoned to lift the linga. As the elephant struggled, the linga grew to huge size and became Mahalinga, shattering the elephant into pieces. The animals' body parts spread out in different direction. The place where its horn (Khombu) fell came to be called ‘Kombettu’, Kari fell ‘Kariyala, legs fell (kalu) ‘Karjala’, hand (Kai) fell ‘Kaipala’ tail fell ‘Beedimajalu’, head (Tale) fell ‘Taleppady’ and back (Beri) fell ‘ Beripadavu’. These place names survived in the surroundings of Puttur. And since the elephant fell dead into the temple tank, a strong belief grew that elephants cannot survive drinking the tank water.
 
Chera Nattoja family of Smartha (Sthanika brahmin) brahmin belonging to the Vishwamitra gotra are the founders (Sthapanacharya) and The Chief priest "Thantris" of Puttur Mahalingeshwara Temple and also Polali Rajarajeshwari Temple. But they lost their reputed position because of the acute Smartha-Vaisnava (Madhva) rivalry, the changed political set up, the British revenue policies and as they joined their hands in freedom fights supporting the local rulers of that time.

See also
 Polali Rajarajeshwari Temple
 Sri Gopalakrishna Temple Kumble
 Madhur Temple
 Kukke Subramanya Temple

References

Hindu temples in Dakshina Kannada district